Agate is an Indonesian video game development company based in Bandung, West Java, Indonesia. It was founded on April 1, 2009. It has worked with publishers such as Square Enix and Electronic Arts.

The company produces serious games, providing gamified applications to companies either via gamification of systems, advertisement games or training games meant to simulate the work environment. Agate had worked for Microsoft, Samsung and Coca-Cola.

In October 2011, Agate together with Kummara and AnimartDigi held Indonesia Bermain in Bandung. 7000 people attended.

History
The founders of Agate met in October 2007 as college students when they decided to make a game with no budget. With no experience on making games beforehand, the game only made it to a playable state before being scrapped. Learning from this experience, the team moved on to make a game for Microsoft's Dream Build Play competition, titled Ponporon!. The title was showcased on Indonesia Game Show in 2008 and gave new hope to the team which drove them to start a video game company, which was founded on April 1, 2009.

Seeing market condition at the time, Agate focused in flash games for a while before venturing to make advergames and service games in 2010. In addition, within that year, the company merged with another game studio named Lucidrine a fellow game studio that had previously worked at several popular flash games such as Valthirian Arc which continues to be an ongoing serial project, now worked on by Agate.

The company expanded once more in 2011 with the establishment of Agate Jogja in Yogyakarta, Indonesia, along with the addition of a publishing division and attaining partnership with Chillingo. Within the same year, Agate had begun developing console games for the first time in its history, along with venturing into the creation of browser-based social games.

In 2012, Agate started a third-party publishing business while their game Football Saga reached its peak of 58.000 monthly users and 10.000 active daily users. Within the year, was also the first ever representative of Indonesia in the annual Tokyo Game Show to appear in its Asia New Stars, an exhibition geared towards introducing emerging game developers from Asia.

In 2013, the company helped co-found AGI (Indonesia Gaming Association) while, in the same year, establishing a partnership with Square Enix to publish and localize Sengoku IXA in Indonesia. In 2014, formed a partnership with Les' Copaque Productions to develop a game for Upin & Ipin.

By 2015, Agate's serious game business expanded outside of Indonesia and South East Asia.

In 2016, scored a US$1,000,000 pre-series A round led by a local venture firm known as Maloekoe Ventures. The company also expanded their serious game business further to the company training games business.

In 2017, Agate secured another partnership, this time with the biggest telecommunications company in Indonesia, Telkom Indonesia. They a growth spurt of over 45% the number of employees than 2016 and achieved the title as the leading game company in Indonesia.

In 2018, Agate released the third installment to their signature franchise, Valthirian Arc, Valthirian Arc: Hero School Story. Working together with the UK based publisher, PQube, the game was released for the PS4, Nintendo Switch and PC.

In 2019, Agate worked together yet again with Telkom Indonesia to create Oolean. A partnership that was announced at Telkom Digisummit of 2019 with the goal of nurturing and sharpening the Indonesian game industry to be more competitive. To date, Agate had created over 250 games and gamification projects. In the same year, Agate also collaborated with CIAYO Stories to present the visual novel game titled Memories.

In 2021, Agate acquired Freemergency, the studio behind Retrograde Arena.

In 2022, Agate launched a revamped version of their website, which positions themselves as 'Metaverse designers, developers, creators'.

Developed Games

References

External links
 

Companies based in Bandung
Video game publishers
Video game development companies
Video game companies of Indonesia
Indonesian companies established in 2009
Video game companies established in 2009